Małgorzata Dorota Olejnik (born 3 June 1966 in Kielce) is a Polish politician. She was elected to the Sejm on 25 September 2005, getting 12398 votes in 33 Kielce district, as candidate from the Samoobrona Rzeczpospolitej Polskiej list.

Olejnik, a quadriplegic who uses a wheelchair, is also an accomplished archer and has represented Poland at the Paralympic Games. She won a gold medal at the 1996 games in Atlanta, a silver in 2000 in Sydney, and a bronze in 2004 in Athens. At the 2008 Summer Paralympics in Beijing, she competed in the women's individual recurve standing event. She won her first two matches and lost her third in the semifinal. She advanced to the bronze medal match but lost to Lindsey Carmichael of the United States and finished in fourth place.

See also 
 Members of Polish Sejm 2005-2007

External links 
 Małgorzata Olejnik - parliamentary page - includes declarations of interest, voting record, and transcripts of speeches.
 

1966 births
Living people
People from Kielce
Members of the Polish Sejm 2005–2007
Women members of the Sejm of the Republic of Poland
Self-Defence of the Republic of Poland politicians
Politicians with paraplegia
Polish sportsperson-politicians
Polish female archers
Paralympic archers of Poland
Paralympic gold medalists for Poland
Paralympic silver medalists for Poland
Paralympic bronze medalists for Poland
Paralympic medalists in archery
Archers at the 1996 Summer Paralympics
Archers at the 2000 Summer Paralympics
Archers at the 2004 Summer Paralympics
Archers at the 2008 Summer Paralympics
Medalists at the 1996 Summer Paralympics
Medalists at the 2000 Summer Paralympics
Medalists at the 2004 Summer Paralympics
Sportspeople from Świętokrzyskie Voivodeship
Sportspeople from Kielce
21st-century Polish women politicians